Glenn D. Joyal is a Canadian judge, who has been the Chief Justice of the Court of King's Bench of Manitoba since his appointment on February 4, 2011.  He replaced Marc M. Monnin, upon his elevation to the Court of Appeal of Manitoba.

Joyal pursued Graduate Studies in Public Law and Political Theory at Oxford University in 1995–1996.  He received a Master of Arts (with distinction) from the University of Manitoba in 1992 and a Bachelor of Laws in 1986 at McGill University. He was admitted to the Bar of Manitoba in 1987 and practised as a Provincial Crown Attorney in Manitoba (1986–1990), with Justice Canada (1990–1997) and then with the firm of Wolch Pinx Tapper Scurfield in Winnipeg (1997–1998).

Joyal was appointed a judge of the Provincial Court of Manitoba in 1998, where he developed his expertise in criminal and constitutional law.  On March 2, 2007, he was appointed to the Manitoba Court of Appeal, replacing Charles Huband.  He became a judge of the Court of Queen's Bench of Manitoba on July 10, 2007, replacing A. L. Clearwater, who elected to become a supernumerary judge.  He was appointed Associate Chief Justice of the Court of Queen's Bench of Manitoba in January 2009.

Joyal works in both English and French and has served as a Member of several Provincial Court Committees. He has been Vice-Chair of the Board of Directors for St. Mary's Academy, a Member of the Board of Directors for Le Cercle Molière and a Member of l'Association des juristes d'expression française du Manitoba.

References
 Government of Canada News Release (accessed September 25, 2014)
 University of Manitoba News Release (accessed September 25, 2014)
 Government of Canada News Release (accessed September 25, 2014)
 Government of Canada News Release (accessed July 26, 2007)
 Government of Canada News Release (accessed July 26, 2007)

Judges in Manitoba
University of Manitoba alumni
Living people
Alumni of the University of Oxford
McGill University Faculty of Law alumni
Year of birth missing (living people)
Place of birth missing (living people)